Jacob Call (died April 20, 1826) was an American lawyer who briefly served as a U.S. representative from Indiana from 1824 to 1825.

Biography 
Born in Kentucky, Call was graduated from an academy in Kentucky where he studied law. He was admitted to the bar and practiced in Vincennes and Princeton, Indiana. He served as judge of the Knox County Circuit Court, 1817, 1818, and 1822–1824.

In 1820, Call represented the defendant in the case of Polly v. Lasselle, losing the case which led to all slaves in the state of Indiana being freed.

Congress 
Call was elected as a Jackson Republican to the Eighteenth Congress to fill the vacancy caused by the death of United States Representative William Prince. He served from December 23, 1824 – March 3, 1825.

Death
He died in Frankfort, Kentucky, on April 20, 1826.

References

18th-century births
1826 deaths
Members of the United States House of Representatives from Indiana
Indiana Democratic-Republicans
Democratic-Republican Party members of the United States House of Representatives